Eric Joseph Perrodin (born February 26, 1959) is an American politician who served as Mayor of Compton, California from 2001 to 2013.

Biography 
Perrodin grew up in Compton, California. Soon after graduation from California State University, Dominguez Hills, he began working for the Compton Police Department. While serving as a police officer, he pursued a Juris Doctor degree at Loyola Law School. After 12 years with the department, Perrodin left to become a Deputy District Attorney for Los Angeles County.

In 2001, Perrodin defeated the incumbent mayor, Omar Bradley. He was re-elected in 2005 and 2009. He has the distinction of being Compton's longest-serving mayor.

Perrodin was investigated in 2007 by the California State Bar for threatening to violate a local newspaper's First Amendment rights after the paper printed an investigative report relative to a contract granted to one of Perrodin's associates. Following the report, Perrodin threatened to yank the city's advertising contract with the paper 

A Times review of city records shows Perrodin was absent from city board and commission meetings nearly two-thirds of the time between July 2009 and July 2010.

2013 Election 
On June 4, 2013, Perrodin was defeated in Compton's municipal election by political newcomer Aja Brown. Brown went on to become the second female mayor (after Doris A. Davis) and the youngest mayor (at the age of 31) ever elected in Compton.

References

External links
Official Biography

1959 births
Living people
African-American mayors in California
Loyola Law School alumni
Mayors of Compton, California
California State University, Dominguez Hills alumni
21st-century African-American people
20th-century African-American people